Hamiduzzaman Sarkar is a Bangladesh Awami League politician and the former Member of Parliament of Rangpur-10.

Career
Sarkar was elected to parliament from Rangpur-10 as an Awami League candidate in 1973.

References

Awami League politicians
Living people
1st Jatiya Sangsad members
Year of birth missing (living people)